The San Pitch Mountains are a  long mountain range located in Juab and Sanpete counties in central Utah, United States.



Description
The range's southwest lies adjacent a north-flowing stretch of the Sevier River, as it transitions north, northwest, west, and then southwest into the Sevier Desert. The river traverses around the adjacent mountain ranges of the Valley and Canyon Mountains.

The range is north-south trending and located between the Juab Valley west and the Sanpete Valley east. Yuba State Park is in the south of Juab Valley and borders the range's southwest, on the Sevier River.

The San Pitch Mountains are the location of Maple Canyon, which along with adjoining Box Canyon is an internationally famous rock climbing area, due to the composition of the rock walls being a conglomerate, with hundreds of routes of widely varying difficulty.

Mountain peaks
The highpoint of the range is Salt Creek Peak, located at the north terminus of the range, and close to the Wasatch Range. The center of the range lies between Big Baldy,  southeasterly, and Little Red Hill, at center-northwest.

Access
The west mountain perimeter is traversed by Utah Route 28 through Levan. The east side of the range through Sanpete Valley is traversed by Utah Route 132 and U.S. 89.

See also

 List of mountain ranges of Utah

References

External links

 Big Baldy, anyplaceamerica (coordinates)(range center)

Mountain ranges of Utah
Mountain ranges of Juab County, Utah
Mountain ranges of Sanpete County, Utah